Father Francisco Noronha (also spelled Francisco Noroña) (often incorrectly cited as Fernando do Noronha) (1748, Seville, Spain - January 12, 1788, Mauritius) was a Spanish physician and botanist who resided for some time at Manila, Luzon, Philippines, where he took much effort to organize the Royal Botanic Garden and stock it with valuable plants. Three sets of his water-colour drawings of Javan plants and one set of 108 numbered drawings still exist.  describes him as "a Spanish physician and botanist who had visited Madagascar", while  call him "a capable botanist from Manila" who in 1786 had taken over supervision of the museum of the Batavian Society of Arts and Sciences in Java.

He is commemorated in the genus Noronhia of the family Oleaceae (including Noronhia emarginata by the Dutch botanists Carl Ludwig Blume and Caspar Georg Carl Reinwardt,) and in the Maderian native plant species of Crepis noronhaea

References

Other sources
.
.
.

.
.

18th-century Spanish botanists
1748 births
1788 deaths